Destiny is the sixth studio album by Latin rap group Barrio Boyzz. It was released in 2000 through SBK Records.

Track listing 
"Quiero Saber Que Es Amor" 
"Vuelve Conmigo"
"Nuestro Destino"
"Obsession"
"Te Olvidé"
"De Ti Depende"
"Summer Señorita"
"Déjame Amarte Más"
"Déjame"
"Dame Tu Amor"
"From Now On"
"Destiny"
"I Want to Know What Love Is"

Barrio Boyzz albums
2000 albums